These are tables of members of the Connecticut Senate.

Connecticut Senate

 
Connecticut
Senate